Issouf ag Maha (Agadez,  February 27, 1962) is a Nigerien Tuareg writer.

In his works, he talks about the tragedy of his people in Arlit region and criticises the uranium exploitation, as well as the unusual Kolleram cardboard phenomenon. He served in the Nigerien Army in the mid-to-early 1980s, in order to save up money for publishing his own books, and to support his family and wife.

Works
 Les Mystères du Niger (La Cheminante, 2004)
 Touaregs du XXIe siècle (Grandvaux, 2006)
 Touareg. Le destin confisqué (Tchinaghen Editions, Paryż 2008)

References

1962 births
Berber Nigeriens
Living people
Tuareg people
Nigerien writers
People from Agadez
Berber writers
Date of birth missing (living people)